Who Do You Think You Are may refer to:

Television series
 Who Do You Think You Are? (British TV series), a genealogy documentary with many adaptations:
 Who Do You Think You Are? (American TV series)
 Who Do You Think You Are? (Australian TV series)
 Who Do You Think You Are? (Canadian TV series)
 Who Do You Think You Are? (Irish TV series)
 , Danish adaptation
 , Norwegian adaption
 , Swedish adaptation

 Who Do You Think You Are? (1976 Australian TV series), an Australian comedy series

Music
 Who Do You Think You Are (album) and its title track, by Dala, 2007
 "Who Do You Think You Are" (Candlewick Green song), 1973; covered by Bo Donaldson and The Heywoods (1974), Saint Etienne (1993), and others
 "Who Do You Think You Are" (Colette Carr song), 2013
 "Who Do You Think You Are" (Collette song), 1990
 "Who Do You Think You Are" (Kim Wilde song), 1992
 "Who Do You Think You Are" (Spice Girls song), 1997
 "Who Do You Think You Are", a song by Angus & Julia Stone from Snow, 2017
 "Who Do You Think You Are?", a song by Cascada from Perfect Day, 2007
 "Who Do You Think You Are?", a song by Gamma Ray from Heaven Can Wait, 1990
 "Who Do You Think You Are?", a song by Gentle Giant from The Missing Piece, 1977
 "Who Do You Think You Are?", a song by Paco from This Is Where We Live, 2004
 "Who Do You Think You Are?", a song by S Club from Seeing Double, 2002

Books
 Who Do You Think You Are?, a 1976 collection of short stories by Malcolm Bradbury
 Who Do You Think You Are? (book), a 1978 collection of short stories by Alice Munro

Other uses
Who Do You Think You Are Live?, a family history conference held annually in London
 "Who Do You Think You Are?", an episode from the 2008 season of This American Life

See also
 "Jar of Hearts", a 2010 single by Christina Perri whose chorus starts and ends with "Who do you think you are?"